Walter Scott Smith Jr. (born October 26, 1940) is a retired United States district judge of the United States District Court for the Western District of Texas.

Education and career

Born in Marlin, Texas, Smith received a Bachelor of Arts degree from Baylor University in 1964. He received a Juris Doctor from Baylor Law School in 1966. He was in private practice in Waco from 1966 to 1980. He was a judge of the 54th State District Court in McLennan County, Texas from 1980 to 1983.

Federal judicial service

Smith was a United States Magistrate for the Western District of Texas, from 1983 to 1984. He was nominated by President Ronald Reagan on September 11, 1984, to the United States District Court for the Western District of Texas, to a new seat created by 98 Stat. 333. He was confirmed by the United States Senate on October 3, 1984, and received his commission on October 4, 1984. He served as Chief Judge from 2003 to 2010. He retired on September 14, 2016.

Suspension from office

On December 3, 2015, the Judicial Council of the United States Court of Appeals for the Fifth Circuit suspended Smith from office for a year, allowing him to clear cases already on his docket. Cases filed in the Waco Division of the Western District will be handled by visiting judges during Smith's suspension. The suspension resulted due to allegations of unwanted sexual advances by Smith towards a female courthouse employee in his chambers in 1998. The suspension ended with his retirement.

References

External links
 

1940 births
Living people
Baylor University alumni
Judges of the United States District Court for the Western District of Texas
United States district court judges appointed by Ronald Reagan
20th-century American judges
United States magistrate judges
People from Marlin, Texas